Mamasani County is in Fars province, Iran. The capital of the county is the city of Nurabad, 180 kilometers from Shiraz. At the 2006 census, the county's population was 162,694 in 35,145 households. The following census in 2011 counted 116,386 people in 30,928 households, by which time Rostam District had been separated from the county to form Rostam County. At the 2016 census, the county's population was 117,527 in 35,060 households.

The Mamasani (also Mohammad-Hassani) tribe also resides in this county and speaks the Mamasani dialect of the Luri language.

Administrative divisions

The population history and structural changes of Mamasani County's administrative divisions over three consecutive censuses are shown in the following table. The latest census shows three districts, nine rural districts, and three cities.

References

External links
 A Mamasani folk song sung by Shusha Guppy in the 1970s: You Must Come to Me

 

Counties of Fars Province